Grafton State Hospital was a psychiatric hospital in Grafton, Massachusetts that operated from 1901 to 1973. Today, the site has been redeveloped with Tufts University's Cummings School of Veterinary Medicine as a major occupant, along with the Grafton Job Corps office and various other State agencies.

Because of its significance in the history of the treatment of the mentally ill and its layout and institutional architecture, the hospital area was accepted to the National Register of Historic Places in 1994.

History
Grafton State Hospital was established in 1901 as a farm colony for "chronic insane patients" of the Worcester State Hospital. In 1912 it was administratively separated from Worcester.

The Grafton campus was built to both increase the capacity of the Worcester hospital and to provide therapeutic work for patients. Intended to be self-sufficient, agriculture was an important part of the hospital's plan. As the agricultural focus grew other areas of treatment suffered, leading the state to conclude in 1945 that "there is little or no occupational therapy in effect now. Farming, canning, and general maintenance are the institution's principal occupations."

In 1957, noted jazz musician Thelonious Monk was briefly held for observation at the Grafton State Hospital after a State Trooper found him at Logan Airport acting erratically and then becoming unresponsive to questioning.

The hospital closed in 1973 when Dr. Sevinsky was charged with raping several of the patients as the first in a series of closures of state institutions in Massachusetts, in a process known as Deinstitutionalization.

Patient census
CENSUS OF GRAFTON STATE HOSPITAL
Year 1908: over 500 patients
Year 1912: 650 patients
Year 1916: over 800 patients
Year 1930: 1550 patients, 328 staff
Year 1931: 1154 patients (563 women, 591 men)
Year 1945: 1730 patients, 250 staff with 241 vacancies
Year 1956: 4537 patients, 200 staff
Year 1973: 641 patients

Campus
The colony is located at the juncture of the Grafton, Shrewsbury, and Westborough town lines, centered at the junction of Pine Street and Westborough Road (Massachusetts Route 30) in North Grafton. By 1945 it encompassed . The Hospital occupied a hilly scenic site surrounded by woodlands, wetlands, and agricultural fields which are still used for hay, corn, and animal pasture by the Cummings School of Veterinary Medicine. Much of the hospital's land was previously farmland which had been allowed to go fallow by private owners in the late-nineteenth century, and was only gradually reclaimed for productive use by the hospital.

Tnts and was developed with large-scale brick wards that provided locked confinement for large numbers of inmates. Similarly, Elms was developed with masonry buildings for "excited" male patients. A few wood-frame dormitories provided a transition for more stable patients. As the center of agricultural activities, Oaks was developed with unlocked cottages for male patients who had proved themselves trustworthy and industrious. The Willows was developed somewhat later during the campus expansion was similar to Oaks. The classes of patients were defined in terms of behavior rather than diagnosis, e.g. "excited", "violent", "quiet", "peaceful", etc.

Current use
A former Boston & Worcester Railroad line, now owned by CSX Transportation and used by the MBTA Commuter Rail Framingham/Worcester Line, bisects the campus. The Grafton Commuter Rail stop is located on the former site, off of Pine Street. In 1978, shortly after the closing of the hospital, Tufts University entered into an agreement with the state to develop a veterinary college on the site, now known as the Cummings School of Veterinary Medicine. Simultaneously, the Job Corps program opened a campus on the hospital site.

 of the original site has become Centech Park, part of a state designated Economic Target Area and now home to several companies.

The development will be the anchor of the Grafton Science Park, designed to spur economic development in Grafton. The laboratory will be capable of Biosafety level 2 and 3 research on infectious agents.

References

External links 
 . (Various documents).
http://www.1856.org/grafton/grafton.html 

Hospitals in Worcester County, Massachusetts